This is the discography of Epitaph Records. The list is ordered by release number. Original release dates are within the parentheses.

Releases

References

Discographies of American record labels
Punk rock discographies